Cheirodon australe is a species of fish in the family Characidae endemic to Chile. It is found in freshwater environments at a benthopelagic depth range. They are native to a subtropical climate.

Cheirodon australe can reach about 4 cm (1.6 in) as an unsexed male. It is distributed in the Pacific versant basins in southern Chile. 

Data are insufficient to determine its conservation status.

References

australe
Freshwater fish of Chile
Fish described in 1928
Taxa named by Carl H. Eigenmann
Taxonomy articles created by Polbot
Endemic fauna of Chile